Zou You (Chinese: 邹游)(born on September 22, 1985) is a professional Chinese footballer.

Club career
Zou You started his professional senior career with top-tier side Dalian Shide as a midfielder and was soon loaned out to second-tier club Dalian Changbo to gain some playing time. Upon his return to Dalian Shide he would make a handful of appearances as the club won the 2005 Chinese Super League title. His appearances for Dalian Shide would see him called up to the China U20 team that took part in the 2005 FIFA World Youth Championship where his height saw him play in two matches as a forward. After being unable to further establish himself with his club he would go on to loaned out once again to another second-tier club in Guangzhou Pharmaceutical during the 2006 league season. He would return to Dalian Shide once again in 2007 however he would only make one further league appearance and was allowed to be transferred to top-tier club Henan Construction in 2008.

At Henan Zou would spend three seasons with the club where he predominantly acted as a fringe player within the squad before being released from the club at the end of the 2010 league season. As a free agent he would join third-tier club Fushun Xinye where he would aid the team to a play-off league spot before they were knocked out in the second round. With Fushun not joining the third tier within the 2012 league season Zou would join second-tier club Chengdu Blades halfway through the 2012 league season.

In February 2015, Zou transferred to China League One side Dalian Aerbin.

In his later career, Zou signed for Shaanxi Chang'an. His first goal for the club was against Cangzhou Mighty Lions on 10 August 2019.

Career statistics
Statistics accurate as of match played 31 December 2020.

Honours

Club
Dalian Shide F.C.
Chinese Super League: 2005

References

External links
 
Player stats at sohu.com

1985 births
Living people
Chinese footballers
Footballers from Dalian
Dalian Shide F.C. players
Guangzhou F.C. players
Henan Songshan Longmen F.C. players
Chengdu Tiancheng F.C. players
Dalian Professional F.C. players
Shaanxi Chang'an Athletic F.C. players
Chinese Super League players
China League One players
China League Two players
Association football midfielders